6Q6 is a small portion of a scroll from Cave 6 at Qumran, containing Song of Songs 1:1-7 in Hebrew. Together with three scroll portions found in Cave 4, they comprise the total witness to the Song from the Dead Sea Scrolls. It is dated to about 50 CE.

See also
 List of Hebrew Bible manuscripts
4Q106 = 4QCanta
4Q107 = 4QCantb
4Q108 = 4QCantc
Biblical manuscript
Tanakh at Qumran

References

External links
Emanuel Tov 'A Categorized List of All the "Biblical Texts" Found in the Judean Desert.' Dead Sea Discoveries 8 (2001): 67–84.
6Q6 at the Leon Levy Dead Sea Scrolls Digital Library

Dead Sea Scrolls
1st-century BC biblical manuscripts